Constantin Radu (5 January 1945 – 16 May 2020) was a Romanian football forward.

International career
Constantin Radu played three friendly games at international level for Romania, making his debut on 7 December 1966 when coach Ilie Oană sent him on the field in the 62nd minute in order to replace Mircea Lucescu in a 2–1 away victory against Israel. His following game was a 2–1 away victory against Greece and his last game played for the national team was a 4–2 away victory against Morocco in which he scored one goal.

Honours
Argeș Pitești
Divizia A: 1971–72

References

External links
Constantin Radu at Labtof.ro

1945 births
2020 deaths
Romanian footballers
Romania international footballers
Association football forwards
Liga I players
Liga II players
FC Argeș Pitești players
Romanian football managers
Sportspeople from Pitești